John England may refer to:

 John C. England (1920–1941), U.S. Navy officer killed in the attack on Pearl Harbor 
 John England (politician) (1911–1985), Administrator of the Northern Territory of Australia and member of the Australian parliament
 John England (bishop) (1786–1842), first Catholic Bishop of Charleston, South Carolina
 John England (cricketer) (born 1940), New Zealand cricketer
 John B. England (1923–1954), World War II fighter ace
 John England, catalogue of Great Universal Stores
 John England (engineer) (1822–1877), British civil engineer
 John Humphrey England (1817–1887), British grocer, merchant, businessman and entrepreneur

See also
 John of England (1166–1216), King of England
 John England & the Western Swingers, Nashville swing band